The Maxim restaurant suicide bombing was a suicide bombing which occurred on October 4, 2003 in the beachfront "Maxim" restaurant in Haifa, Israel. Twenty-one people were killed in the attack and 60 were injured. Among the victims were two families and four children, including a two-month-old baby.

The restaurant, which is located at the seafront near the southern boundary of the city of Haifa, was frequently attended by both Arab and Jewish local populations, and was widely seen as a symbol of peaceful coexistence in Haifa.

Militant organization Islamic Jihad claimed responsibility for the attack. It was condemned by Palestinian President Yasser Arafat.
The restaurant's interior was destroyed by the blast (it was completely rebuilt seven months after the attack).

Background 
The Maxim restaurant is a beachfront restaurant located near the south entry to Haifa. It is co-owned by Jews and Christian Arabs, and is known for being a symbol of co-existence.

The attack 

On October 4, 2003, the 28-year-old Palestinian suicide bomber Hanadi Jaradat detonated the explosive belt she was wearing inside the Arab-Jewish Maxim restaurant in Haifa. 21 Israelis (18 Jews and 3 Arabs) were killed, and 60 others were wounded.
The bomb included metal fragments packed around the explosive core, that sprayed around the restaurant, maximizing lethal effect. According to Haifa police sources, the aftermath was gruesome, with some of the dead still sitting upright at their tables, while others, including children and babies, were slammed against the walls. Due to the force of the explosion, all that remained of Jaradat was her head.

Among the victims were two families and four children, including a two-month-old baby. Three Maccabi Haifa officials were lightly injured in the bombing.

The perpetrator 

The suicide bomber, 28-year-old Hanadi Jaradat from Jenin, was the sixth female suicide bomber of the Al-Aqsa Intifada and the second woman recruited by Islamic Jihad.

When she was 21, her fiancé had been killed by Israeli security forces. At the time of her suicide bombing, Jaradat was a law student due to qualify as a lawyer in a few weeks. According to a story in Ha'aretz, based on Arab media and interviews with Israeli and Arab sources, she agreed to the bombing after Israel Defense Forces undercover operatives in Jenin killed her cousin (Salah, 34), and her younger brother (Fadi, 25), both of whom were accused by Israeli forces of being Islamic Jihad operatives, with her cousin being considered to be a senior member of the Al-Quds Brigades group.

Israeli response 

The day following the suicide bombing, the Israeli Army demolished the home of Jaradat's family, and the homes of two neighbors who were uninvolved in the bombing. In response to the attack, which Israel claimed was planned in the Damascus headquarters of the Palestinian Islamic Jihad, an alleged terrorist training camp in Ain es-Saheb, Syria, was bombed by four Israeli Air Force jets. One person was injured, and munitions were allegedly destroyed during the strike.

Jamal Mahadjne, an Israeli-Arab from Umm al-Fahm, was arrested within hours of the attack for driving Jaradat to her destination. Mahadjne had regularly taken fees for illegally driving Palestinians to Israel, taking advantage of his Israeli identity card to cross the border without difficulty. He confessed his actions to Shin Bet agents, and was indicted before the Haifa District Court for being an accessory to murder and for other crimes relating to his illegal activities on November 10.

On November 7, Israel Defense Forces troops arrested senior Islamic Jihad militant Amjad Abeidi, who planned the attack, along with a number of other suicide bombings, during an operation in Jenin. During the operation, Jenin was placed under curfew as soldiers searched homes. One Palestinian teenager was shot dead while climbing a tank, and three Palestinians were wounded. The complex in which Abeidi was hiding was located and searched, and a weapons cache was found. After a grenade was thrown into the cache, Abeidi was lightly wounded and surrendered. As the soldiers left Jenin with Abeidi, Palestinian militants opened fire at them, and the soldiers returned fire. One militant, a member of the Al-Aqsa Martyrs' Brigades, was killed. Abeidi was handed over to Shin Bet for interrogation.

In 2017 Oran Almog, one of the victims of the attack, addressed the United Nations Security Council to demand that the Palestinian Authority cease incentivizing terrorism by paying stipends to terrorists.

Official reactions
Israeli prime minister Ariel Sharon stated that Israel held Palestinian President Yasser Arafat responsible for the attack. Arafat condemned the bombing. U.S. President George W. Bush condemned the attack, calling it a "murderous action"and a "despicable attack".

Aftermath

In response to his daughter's actions, her father Taisir declined all condolences, instead saying that he was proud of what his daughter had done, and that "I will accept only congratulations for what she did. This was a gift she gave me, the homeland and the Palestinian people."

In October 2012, the Arab Lawyers Union awarded their top award to Hanadi Jaradat, and sent a delegation to her family to present them with the award.  Ayman Abu Eisheh, who is a member of the Palestine Committee at the Arab Lawyers Union, explained that the lawyers were proud of Jaradat, saying that suicide bombing was "in defense of Palestine and the Arab nation."

Although the interior of the restaurant was destroyed in the attack, it was quickly rebuilt and reopened within several months. A monument was erected near the restaurant in memory of the victims killed in the attack.

See also
 Civilian casualties in the Second Intifada
 Palestinian political violence
 Israeli casualties of war
 Islamic terrorism

References

External links
 Suicide bombing of Maxim restaurant in Haifa – published at the Israeli Ministry of Foreign Affairs
 Suicide attacker kills at least 19 in north of Israel – published in The New York Times on October 5, 2003
 Israel suicide attack kills 20 – published by BBC News on October 4, 2003
 Bomb kills 19, wounds 50 in Israel – published in The Boston Globe on October 5, 2003
 Homicide Bomber Kills 19 at Israeli Restaurant – published by Fox News on October 5, 2003
 Female Bomber Kills 19 In Israeli Suicide Strike – published in the New York Daily News on October 5, 2003
 Woman suicide bomber kills 19 Israelis on Jewish holy day – published inb The Daily Telegraph on October 5, 2003

Suicide bombings in 2003
Israeli casualties in the Second Intifada
Suicide bombing in the Israeli–Palestinian conflict
Islamic Jihad Movement in Palestine
Islamic terrorism in Israel
Terrorist attacks attributed to Palestinian militant groups
Terrorist incidents in Israel in 2003
Mass murder in 2003
Massacres in Israel
Attacks on restaurants in Asia
History of Haifa
Terrorist incidents in Haifa
October 2003 events in Asia
Building bombings in Israel